José de la Torre (born 3 April 1913, date of death unknown) was a Mexican sports shooter. He competed in the 50 m rifle event at the 1948 Summer Olympics.

References

1913 births
Year of death missing
Mexican male sport shooters
Olympic shooters of Mexico
Shooters at the 1948 Summer Olympics
People from Jalisco
Pan American Games medalists in shooting
Pan American Games silver medalists for Mexico
Shooters at the 1951 Pan American Games
20th-century Mexican people